is a Japanese voice actor from Tokyo, Japan.

Biography

Filmography

Anime
1998
Brain Powerd (Yuu Isami)

1999
Infinite Ryvius (Kouji Aiba)

2000
Boogiepop Phantom (Yasushi Sanada)

2001
S-CRY-ed (Kyouji Mujyou)

2002
SaiKano (Atsushi)
Mobile Suit Gundam SEED (Sai Argyle)

2003
Wolf's Rain (Retriever)
Texhnolyze (Messenger, Representative from Class)
Fullmetal Alchemist (Kain Fuery)

2004
Gankutsuou: The Count of Monte Cristo (Beauchamp)
Mobile Suit Gundam SEED Destiny (Narrator, Sai Argyle)

2005
GUNxSWORD (Researcher)
Full Metal Panic! The Second Raid (Woo)

2006
xxxHOLiC (Spirit)
La Corda D'Oro: primo passo (Concours Judge)
Code Geass: Lelouch of the Rebellion (Lloyd Asplund)
Strain: Strategic Armored Infantry (Cedi)

2007
Polyphonica (Yokio)
Moribito: Guardian of the Spirit (Rice Store's Young Master)
Blue Dragon (Deathroy)

2008
Blue Dragon (Desuroi)
Code Geass: Lelouch of the Rebellion R2 (Lloyd Asplund)
Slayers Revolution (Sorcerer)
Mobile Suit Gundam 00 Second Season (Andrei Smirnov)

2009
Clannad After Story (Employee)
Fullmetal Alchemist: Brotherhood (Gluttony, Han)

2010
Demon King Daimao (Yata-garasu)

2011
Fairy Tail (Zancrow)

2012
The Knight in the Area (Leonardo Silva)
Horizon in the Middle of Nowhere (Felipe Segundo)

2017
Digimon Universe: Appli Monsters (Fakemon)

2018
Free! Dive to the Future (Kurimiya Kon)

2020
Cagaster of an Insect Cage (Mercantile District Head)

Games
Sengoku Basara 3 (Mogami Yoshiaki)
Super Robot Wars series (Andrei Smirnov)

Films
Fullmetal Alchemist the Movie: Conqueror of Shamballa (Master Sergeant Kain Fuery)
Code Geass: Lelouch of the Re;surrection (Lloyd Asplund)

Tokusatsu
Kaizoku Sentai Gokaiger (Yokubarido (ep. 10))
Zyuden Sentai Kyoryuger (Debo Doronboss (ep. 4))
Doubutsu Sentai Zyuohger (Halbergoi (ep. 2))
Uchu Sentai Kyuranger (Inda (other by Hiroki Shimowada, Akihiro Matsushima) (ep. 27))
Kaitou Sentai Lupinranger VS Keisatsu Sentai Patranger (Envy Chiruda) (ep. 33)

Dubbing

Live-action
 Almost Famous (William Miller (Patrick Fugit))
 Rome (Gaius Octavian (Max Pirkis))

Animation
 Fillmore! (Cornelius Fillmore)
 Teen Titans (Puppet King)

References

External links
 
 

1972 births
Living people
Japanese male video game actors
Japanese male voice actors
Male voice actors from Tokyo